Anouar El Mhassani (born 18 April 2001) is a Dutch professional footballer who plays as a midfielder or winger.

Career

After 8 years at the academy of Ajax Amsterdam, El Mhassani signed his first professional contract in July 2017 for West Ham United, where he spent 3 years playing for their U18 & U23 teams.

In 2020, El Mhassani signed for Ajman Club in the Emirati top flight.

References

External links
 Anouar El Mhassani at Soccerway

Living people
Dutch footballers
Dutch expatriate footballers
Dutch sportspeople of Moroccan descent
Association football midfielders
Association football wingers
UAE Pro League players
Ajman Club players
Expatriate footballers in England
Expatriate footballers in the United Arab Emirates
Dutch expatriate sportspeople in England
Dutch expatriate sportspeople in the United Arab Emirates
2001 births